Selena Lin is a popular manhua artist in Taiwan. She is known for her shōjo style manhua. Her work includes romantic comic books, coloring books, magazines and calendars.

References 

20th-century Taiwanese women
20th-century women artists
21st-century Taiwanese women
21st-century women artists
Artists from New Taipei
Living people
Taiwanese comics artists
Year of birth missing (living people)